The Monroe County Fairgrounds in Monroe County, Michigan includes a number of buildings.

History
The Monroe County Agricultural Society organized its first fair in 1849, but it wasn’t until 1948 that it was moved to this permanent location.  All of the 120 acres of property is owned by the county and leased to the fair association on a 99-year agreement.  

In 1952, a one half mile dirt oval on the premises hosted its only Grand National Series (now NASCAR Cup) event.   The race was won by racing pioneer Tim Flock, who went on to win that year’s series championship.

Facilities

Stock Arena
Glenn F. Stock Arena is a 2,000-seat indoor arena located in Monroe, Michigan.  It is used for sporting events, concerts, conventions, and trade shows.  It is part of the Monroe County Fairgrounds.  Stock Arena is also used for graduation ceremonies of Monroe County's high schools.

Although the Monroe County Fair's website hails the arena one of the "largest arenas in Michigan," this is actually not true as far as seating capacity is concerned; in fact, Stock Arena seats up to 3,500 for concerts. Many indoor arenas in Michigan have larger seating capacities. Also, several of them, including Little Caesars Arena, Breslin Center, and Van Andel Arena have higher ceiling heights. Stock Arena is, however, Monroe County's largest arena and the largest in Toledo's northern suburbs.

Other amenities include a -by-210-foot pipe fence separating the stands from the arena floor, and a wireless PA system that can be used inside and outside the building.

Other fairground facilities
Other facilities at the Monroe County Fairgrounds include:
Two buildings and a livestock show arena with  each of space
The  Far West Building
The 2,400 4H Craft Building
Two horse rings and 270 horse stalls
A 9,000-seat grandstand used for auto racing and rodeos.
Parking for 4,000 cars.

References

External links
Monroe County Fair

Fairgrounds in the United States
Convention centers in Michigan
Indoor arenas in Michigan
Sports venues in Michigan
Buildings and structures in Monroe County, Michigan
Tourist attractions in Monroe County, Michigan
NASCAR tracks
Defunct motorsport venues in the United States